The Sykes's nightjar, Sykes' nightjar, Sind nightjar or Sindh nightjar (Caprimulgus mahrattensis) is a nightjar species found in northwestern South Asia.

The name commemorates Colonel William Henry Sykes, who served with the British military in India.

References

Sykes's nightjar
Birds of Afghanistan
Birds of Pakistan
Taxa named by William Henry Sykes
Sykes's nightjar